According to several public surveys in Kosovo and reports from institutions such as the European Commission, levels of corruption and impunity among politicians are high.

Perceptions 
On Transparency International's 2021 Corruption Perceptions Index, Kosovo scored 39 on a scale from 0 ("highly corrupt") to 100 ("highly clean"). When ranked by score, Kosovo ranked 87th among the 180 countries in the Index, where the country ranked first is perceived to have the most honest public sector.  For comparison, the best score was 88 (ranked 1), and the worst score was 11 (ranked 180).

Dynamics 
The European Commission reports that electoral fraud persists in Kosovo representing serious shortcomings in the electoral process. Transparency International Global Corruption Barometer 2013 points out that political parties are considered the second most corrupt institution in Kosovo by a significantly high number of households, second only to the judiciary.

Corruption is considered the largest obstacle to doing business in Kosovo, and businesses frequently resort to bribes when interacting with public officials. Sectors such as customs, manufacturing, electricity, gas and water supply are identified as those most affected by corruption. There are a number of burdensome and costly procedures for companies to undergo in order to obtain business licences and permits, these lead to increased opportunities for corruption.

See also 
 Crime in Kosovo

References

External links
Kosovo Corruption Profile from the Business Anti-Corruption Portal

Kosovo
Serbia
Society of Kosovo
Politics of Kosovo
Crime in Kosovo by type